Andrea Lazzari (born 3 December 1984) is an Italian footballer who plays as a midfielder for FC Vigor Senigallia.

Club career

Atalanta
Born in Milan, Lazzari started his professional career at hometown club Atalanta. During 2003–04 Serie B season, he was promoted from Primavera under–20 team to the first team. He made his Serie B debut on 4 October 2003, substituted Riccardo Montolivo in the 86th minute. He followed the team promoted back to Serie A as the 5th and made his Serie A on 22 September 2004, replaced Nicola Mingazzini in the 81st minute. Lazzari scored a hat-trick against Juventus in Coppa Italia, a match in which Juventus was eliminated in a 5–3 aggregate, while Lazzari also scored the 2 goals in the first leg. Lazzari followed Atalanta relegated back to Serie B in June 2005. He won Serie B champion with the team in June 2006.

In August 2006, he was loaned back to Serie B for Cesena, as part of the deal that Atalanta signed Adriano Ferreira Pinto. On 31 January 2007 he was sub-loan to Piacenza Calcio, as part of the deal that Cesena signed Alessandro Pellicori. In July 2007, he was loaned to Serie B newcomer Grosseto, where he finally became a regular starter and scored 9 goals.

Cagliari
On 9 July 2008, he was sold to fellow Serie A side Cagliari in co-ownership deal, in a four-year contract, for €1.8 million fee. He took no.10 shirt from departed winger Pasquale Foggia but started occasionally. He became a regular starter in 2009–10 season, after Andrea Cossu became the first choice attacking midfielder, with Lazzari acting as left midfielder. He scored 6 goals that season. On 3 June 2010, Cagliari decided to sign him outright for another €2 million.

Fiorentina
In July 2011 Lazzari was signed by ACF Fiorentina in another co-ownership deal, for €3 million, in a 4-year contract. In June 2012 La Viola acquired Lazzari outright for another €1.638 million.

Udinese (loan)
On 30 August 2012, Lazzari moved to Udinese on loan.

With his new team, on 2 September 2012, he scored in a 4–1 defeat against Juventus at Stadio Friuli. The loan was renewed for 2013–14 Serie A season.

In the Europa League qualifying round match against Bosnian club Široki Brijeg in August 2013, Lazzari scored from the halfway line as Udinese won 4–0.

Return to Fiorentina
Lazzari played three times for La Viola in 2014–15 Serie A.

Carpi
In summer 2015 Lazzari was signed by Carpi F.C. 1909 in a one-year contract as a free agent.

Bari
On 1 February 2016, Lazzari was signed by Bari, with Filippo Porcari moved to opposite direction.

Later career
On 17 December 2019, it was confirmed, that Lazzari had joined Eccellenza club FC Vigor Senigallia.

International career
Lazzari was an unused member of Italy U21 team at 2007 UEFA European Under-21 Football Championship.

References

External links
 
 
 Profile at AIC.Football.it  
 
 Profile at La Gazzetta dello Sport (2009–10)  
 Profile at La Gazzetta dello Sport (2007–08)  
 Profile at La Gazzetta dello Sport (2006–07)  
 FIGC  

Living people
1984 births
Footballers from Bergamo
Italian footballers
Italy under-21 international footballers
Association football wingers
Serie A players
Serie B players
Serie C players
Eccellenza players
Atalanta B.C. players
A.C. Cesena players
Piacenza Calcio 1919 players
F.C. Grosseto S.S.D. players
Cagliari Calcio players
ACF Fiorentina players
A.C. Carpi players
S.S.C. Bari players
Pisa S.C. players
Alma Juventus Fano 1906 players